John Edward Orr (June 4, 1918 – July 12, 1982) was an American professional basketball and semi-professional baseball player during the 1940s. He played in the National Basketball League for four seasons as well as in the New York Yankees' baseball farm leagues for four seasons.

A native of Chicago, Illinois, Orr was a multi-sport star at St. Rita of Cascia High School. After playing one season of college basketball, Orr signed a contract to play baseball in the Yankees' farm system, this ending his collegiate eligibility. He was a pitcher. Orr played baseball for the Norfolk Elks (1938), Akron Yankees and Norfolk Tars (1939), Joplin Miners, Akron Yankees, and Norfolk Tars (1940), and the Akron Yankees and Columbus Red Birds (1941).

In the National Basketball League, Orr competed as a guard for the Chicago Studebaker Flyers (1942–43), Sheboygan Red Skins (1943–44), and Chicago American Gears (1944–46). In his lone season with the Red Skins, the team lost the NBL championship to the Fort Wayne Zollner Pistons and finished second in the league.

References

1918 births
1982 deaths
Akron Yankees players
American men's basketball players
Baseball pitchers
Baseball players from Chicago
Basketball players from Chicago
Benedictine Ravens men's basketball players
Chicago American Gears players
Chicago Studebaker Flyers players
Columbus Red Birds players
Guards (basketball)
Joplin Miners players
Norfolk Elks players
Norfolk Tars players
Sheboygan Red Skins players